Gazzarri is an Italian surname.

Geographical distribution
As of 2014, 96.8% of all known bearers of the surname Gazzarri were residents of Italy (frequency 1:90,839), 2.0% of Argentina (1:3,053,108) and 1.2% of the United States (1:45,156,410).

In Italy, the frequency of the surname was higher than national average (1:90,839) only in one region: Tuscany (1:5,980).

People
 Pablo Gazzarri, Argentine Roman Catholic priest

Other
 Gazzarri's, nightclub on Sunset Strip, West Hollywood

References

Italian-language surnames
Surnames of Italian origin